More than Puppy Love is a 2002 American family film directed by Tom Whitus and starring Pamela Bach and Diane Ladd.

Plot
A family is given a puppy for a year to undergo domestic training to become a help dog for the disabled. The young daughter in the household becomes a best friend of the puppy and finds it difficult to be parted from him when the time is up for him to leave.

Cast
Diane Ladd ... Aunt Edna
Pamela Bach ... Marie 
Craig Benton ... Curtis
Jim Petersmith ... Charles Barnett
Hollis McCarthy ... Laura Barnett
Kyla Pratt ... Emily
Nathan Hutchings ... Steve Barnett
Allan Kayser ... Tony

References

External links

Rotten Tomatoes

2002 films
Films about dogs
2002 drama films
American drama films
2000s English-language films
2000s American films